This is a list of exponential topics, by Wikipedia page. See also list of logarithm topics.
 Accelerating change
 Approximating natural exponents (log base e)
 Artin–Hasse exponential  
 Bacterial growth  
 Baker–Campbell–Hausdorff formula
 Cell growth  
 Barometric formula  
 Beer–Lambert law  
 Characterizations of the exponential function  
 Catenary  
 Compound interest  
 De Moivre's formula  
 Derivative of the exponential map  
 Doléans-Dade exponential  
 Doubling time  
 e-folding  
 Elimination half-life  
 Error exponent  
 Euler's formula  
 Euler's identity  
 e (mathematical constant)  
 Exponent  
 Exponent bias  
 Exponential (disambiguation)  
 Exponential backoff  
 Exponential decay  
 Exponential dichotomy  
 Exponential discounting  
 Exponential diophantine equation  
 Exponential dispersion model  
 Exponential distribution  
 Exponential error  
 Exponential factorial  
 Exponential family  
 Exponential field  
 Exponential formula  
 Exponential function  
 Exponential generating function  
 Exponential-Golomb coding  
 Exponential growth  
 Exponential hierarchy  
 Exponential integral  
 Exponential integrator  
 Exponential map (Lie theory)  
 Exponential map (Riemannian geometry)  
 Exponential map (discrete dynamical systems)
 Exponential notation  
 Exponential object   (category theory)
 Exponential polynomials—see also Touchard polynomials   (combinatorics)
 Exponential response formula  
 Exponential sheaf sequence  
 Exponential smoothing  
 Exponential stability  
 Exponential sum  
 Exponential time  
 Sub-exponential time  
 Exponential tree  
 Exponential type  
 Exponentially equivalent measures  
 Exponentiating by squaring  
 Exponentiation
 Fermat's Last Theorem
 Forgetting curve
 Gaussian function  
 Gudermannian function  
 Half-exponential function  
 Half-life  
 Hyperbolic function  
 Inflation, inflation rate    
 Interest  
 Lifetime (physics)  
 Limiting factor  
 Lindemann–Weierstrass theorem  
 List of integrals of exponential functions  
 List of integrals of hyperbolic functions  
 Lyapunov exponent  
 Malthusian catastrophe  
 Malthusian growth model  
 Marshall–Olkin exponential distribution  
 Matrix exponential  
 Moore's law  
 Nachbin's theorem  
 Piano key frequencies
 p-adic exponential function  
 Power law  
 Proof that e is irrational  
 Proof that e is transcendental  
 Q-exponential  
 Radioactive decay  
 Rule of 70, Rule of 72    
 Scientific notation
 Six exponentials theorem  
 Spontaneous emission  
 Super-exponentiation  
 Tetration  
 Versor  
 Wilkie's theorem  
 Zenzizenzizenzic  

Exponentials
Exponential